Group 2 of the 1974 FIFA World Cup was contested between 13 and 22 June 1974, with matches played in three cities: Dortmund, Gelsenkirchen and Frankfurt.

The pool is composed of defending champions Brazil, Scotland, Yugoslavia and Zaire.

Standings

Matches
All times listed are local (CET)

Brazil vs Yugoslavia

Zaire vs Scotland

Yugoslavia vs Zaire

Scotland vs Brazil

Scotland vs Yugoslavia

Zaire vs Brazil

References

External sources

Group 2
Brazil at the 1974 FIFA World Cup
Group
Yugoslavia at the 1974 FIFA World Cup
Zaire at the 1974 FIFA World Cup